Wolfgang Hugo Rheinhold (26 March 1853 – 2 October 1900) was a German sculptor best known for his Affe mit Schädel ("Ape with Skull"). His surname is often misspelled "Reinhold".

Life
Hugo Rheinhold was born in Oberlahnstein, Prussia, on March 26, 1853. He went to school in Koblenz before entering the merchant trade. When 21, Rheinhold sought success in the United States and became an import and export merchant, living in San Francisco (1874–1878), where he had the head office for his business, as well as in Hamburg, where he settled in 1879. The next year he married his childhood sweetheart Emma Levy from Cologne; she was to die in 1882, after only one-and-a-half years of marriage. Emma's death had a huge impact Rheinhold. He sold his successful business and moved to Berlin to study science and philosophy at the Friedrich-Wilhelms University. In 1886, he studied under the sculptors Ernst Herter and Max Kruse, before officially enrolling as a student at the Berlin Academy of Arts (1888–1892).  He died, aged 47, in Berlin.

Works

Rheinhold produced a series of notable works within a very short career span. These include: a group of reading monks (Lesende Monche), a tribute to Alfred Nobel (Dynamite in the Service of Mankind), a bust of socialist leader August Bebel and his most famous piece Am Wege (1896) a marble of "an unfortunate young woman with a child at her breast". His biggest bronze work was for Dynamit Nobel AG, a statue titled Dynamite in the Service of Man, which included a tall goddess, possibly representing Athena, with a foot over a prostrate man. The statue was melted down for use in the Second World War for armaments.

Rheinhold was protective of his Jewish heritage, and was a strong influence in the Deutsch-Israelitischer Gemeindebund (an association of Jewish corporations). He sculpted Die Kämpfer ("The Warriors") in protest against burgeoning anti-Semitism. His last work, of serpentine deities in a fountain ("Brunnengrotte mit zwei Wassergottheiten"), was exhibited close to his death in 1900.

Today, Rheinhold is probably known for his Affe mit Schädel.

Notes

References
 Morgan, R., & Moore, A. Hugo Rheinhold's monkey. Boston Medical Library. (Website). 1. Dec. 1998. Retrieved on 1. Dec. 2008.
 Richter, J., & Schmetzke, A. (2007). Hugo Rheinhold's philosophizing monkey—a modern Owl of the Minerva. NTM—International Journal of History and Ethics of Natural Sciences, Technology and Medicine, 15(2), 81–97.
 Schmetzke, A. Other Sculptures by Hugo Rheinhold.  Hugo Rheinhold ... and his Philosophizing Monkey. (Website). Library, University of Wisconsin–Stevens Point. 8. Dec 1999, last revised 6. Nov. 2008. Retrieved  on 1. Dec. 2008.
 Singer, I., & Mannheimer, S.(1901–1906). Rheinhold, Hugo. In The Jewish Encyclopedia (pp. 399–400). New York:  Funk & Wagnalls.

External links

 Hugo Rheinhold ... and his Philosophizing Monkey 
 Varieties of Rheinhold's Philosophizing Darwin Monkey
 Der Philosophische Affe und die Eule der Minerva
 Hugo's Philosophical Ape

1853 births
1900 deaths
German sculptors
German male sculptors
19th-century sculptors